The M53/59 Praga is a Czechoslovak self-propelled anti-aircraft gun developed in the late 1950s. It consists of a heavily modified Praga V3S six-wheel drive truck chassis, armed with a twin 30 mm AA autocannon mounted on the rear for which the vehicle typically carries 900 rounds of ammunition, each gun being gravity fed from distinctive 50 round magazines. The vehicle has an armoured cabin.

In Czechoslovakia it was known as Praga PLDvK vz. 53/59 - "Ještěrka" (PLDvK Model 53/59 - "Lizard"). PLDvK stands for Protiletadlový dvojkanón = Anti-aircraft twin-cannon.

The system is optically aimed and can only be used effectively during the day with good weather conditions. The gun can be dismounted and used independently of the vehicle.

While mostly obsolete in anti-aircraft role, it can be used effectively as a ground support weapon against unarmored or lightly armored targets, as was shown during the Yugoslav wars. It remains in service with armies of Egypt, Libya, Serbia, Slovakia etc.

When Czechoslovakia imported one Soviet-made ZSU-57-2 for testing it considered it to be comparable to M53/59 which was the reason Czechoslovakia refused the Soviet SPAAG.

Combat history

  in Chadian–Libyan conflict 1978-1987 and Libyan civil war 2011-2020
  in Iran–Iraq War 1980-1988, Gulf War 1990-1991 and Iraqi conflict (2003–present)
  - in Yugoslav Wars 1991-2001
  - (March 23 Movement) in M23 rebellion 2012-2013

Operators
  - (March 23 Movement) One seen operated by M23 rebels entering the city of Goma.
  - Unknown
  - Seen in service at artillery battalion of 9th armoured division.
  - 110 ordered in 1970 from Czechoslovakia and delivered between 1970 and 1973.
  - 48 in service
  - Unknown

Former Operators
  - Passed on to the successor states.
  - Last vehicle retired from service in 2003.
  - Two were given to a local army museum, rest was phased out and scrapped.
  - Retired
  - Retired?
  - Retired. Some donated to museums.
  - 220 ordered in 1965 from Czechoslovakia and delivered between 1965 and 1968. By 1991 their quantity grew to 789. Passed on to the successor states.
  - Unknown 
  - Unknown

See also
BRAMS design successor
Praga (vehicle works)

References

External links

Czech army shooting training

Self-propelled anti-aircraft weapons
Anti-aircraft guns of Czechoslovakia
30 mm artillery
Military vehicles introduced in the 1950s
Self-propelled artillery of Czechoslovakia